Horton is a village in East Dorset, England, situated on the boundary between the chalk downland of Cranborne Chase and the Dorset Heaths, and ten miles north of Poole.  The village has a population of 515 (2001).

Overview
The name Horton is a common one in England. It derives from Old English horu 'dirt' and tūn 'settlement, farm, estate', presumably meaning 'farm on muddy soil'. The earliest reference to the one in Dorset is in a charter of 946 ACE, albeit surviving only in a fourteenth-century copy, which mentions 'oþ hore tuninge gemære' ('to the boundary of the people of Horton').

The village has two unusual buildings: the Horton Tower, a five storey gothic red brick observatory designed by Humphrey Sturt whose principal purpose now is that of a disguised mobile phone mast for operator Vodafone, and the 18th century Georgian church of St Wolfrida, built on the site of the tenth century Horton Priory. Wolfrida was the mother of Saint Edith of Wilton.

Horton is claimed as the location where James Scott, 1st Duke of Monmouth, was captured after the failed Monmouth Rebellion.  Monmouth hid in a ditch under an ash tree disguised as a shepherd but was betrayed by a local woman who, according to legend, later killed herself in remorse.

The village once had a manor house but this was superseded by Crichel House, a nearby stately home, and the manor house decayed and was pulled down.  The stables, now converted into the rectory, and a large ornamental lake, remain.

Horton church is the burial place of Sir George Hastings.

See also
Horton Priory

References
5.http://www.bbc.co.uk/dorset/content/articles/2009/01/28/folly_horton_tower_feature.shtml

Bibliography
 Pitt-Rivers, Michael, 1968. Dorset. London: Faber & Faber.

External links

 Census data
 The Dorset Page: Horton
Horton, St Wolfrida: Britain Express
Our Benefice: Horton

Villages in Dorset
Civil parishes in Dorset